The International Topkapi Trophy is a Group 2 flat horse race in Turkey open to horses aged three years or older. It is run at Veliefendi Race Course over a distance of 1,600 metres (about 1 mile), and it is scheduled to take place each year in early September. The race is part of Istanbul's International Racing Festival.

History
The Topkapi Trophy was elevated to international Group 2 level in 2009, though in 2018 it lost that status becoming Local Group 2 and substantially reducing its prizemoney..

Records since 2000
Most successful horse (3 wins):
 Pressing – (2008), (2009), (2010)

Leading jockey (4 wins):
 Neil Callan – Pressing (2008), (2009), (2010), Glory Awaits (2014)

Leading trainer (3 wins):
 Michael Jarvis – Pressing (2008), (2009), (2010)

Winners since 2000

See also
 List of Turkish flat horse races

References

Racing Post:
horseracingintfed.com – International Federation of Horseracing Authorities – International Topkapi Trophy (2017).

Open middle distance horse races
Horse races in Turkey